Diana Gudaevna Gurtskaya (born 2 July 1978) is a Russian pop singer well-known in the countries of the former Soviet Union. 

Diana was born July 2, 1978 in Abkhazia (ex-Soviet Georgia). She has been afflicted with visual impairment from the day she was born. Following the break-up of the Soviet Union and ensuing bloody conflict in Abkhazia (province of Georgia) in the early 1990s, her family was forced to endure the miseries of life in a refugee camp, which eventually led them to migrate to Russia. In 1995, she won an international junior song contest. From that moment on, Diana became widely popular in Russia, Ukraine, Georgia, Israel and countries with substantial Russian-speaking minorities. After signing with a major Russian music label, Diana released a series of hit singles with a record-breaking number of copies sold.

She has recorded duets with various well-known foreign singers including Ray Charles, Toto Cutugno, and Demis Roussos.

In 2006, President Vladimir Putin presented Diana with “The Honored Artist of Russia” award – one of the highest state prizes in the Russian show business. In an online voting on March 1, 2008, residents of Georgia had voted for Diana to represent Georgia in the Eurovision song contest to be held in Belgrade this year. Diana competed with 12 finalists from Georgia and scored a landslide victory, after her performance of the song “Peace will come”.

In 2009, on the International Paralympic Day, held for the first time in Moscow, the Organizing Committee of the Sochi 2014 Olympic Games awarded Diana Gurtskaya the status of Sochi 2014 Ambassador as a person who promotes the ideas of the Olympic and Paralympic movement in Russia and the world.

Diana is a member of the Public Council under Chairman of the Federation Council of the Federal Assembly of the Russian Federation. Since 2011 Diana has served as a member of the Public Chamber of the Russian Federation, Chairman of the Commission for Improving Accessible Environment and Inclusive practices. In 2013, Diana was appointed a member of the Commission under the President of the Russian Federation for Disabled People.

Diana is married to the Professor of Law from the Peoples’ Friendship University of Russia, Doctor of Law Petr Kucherenko. In June 2007, Diana gave birth to a baby son, Constantine. 

In 2018 Diana launched yet another initiative - the "Centre for Social Integration” for people with disabilities under the Department of labor and social protection of the population of Moscow. This project aims to help people with disabilities better integrate into the society through various forms of art (vocal, theatrical and computer design) using inclusive methods.

In 2022, she was awarded with "People's Artist of the Russian Federation".

Discography

Studio albums
 Ty zdess (2000)
 Ty Znayesh mama (2002)
 Utro (2003)
 Nezhnaya (2004)
 9 Mesjacev (2007)
 Ja Ljublju vas vseh (2009)

Compilation albums
 MP3 Collection (2006)
 Novoye i luchshyeye (2009)

Filmography

References

External links

 Diana Gurtskaya Biography

1979 births
Living people
21st-century women singers from Georgia (country)
People from Sukhumi
Blind musicians
Eurovision Song Contest entrants for Georgia (country)
Eurovision Song Contest entrants of 2008
Georgian emigrants to Russia
Georgian people of Russian descent
Pop singers from Georgia (country)
Members of the Civic Chamber of the Russian Federation
Institute of Contemporary Art, Moscow alumni
People's Artists of Russia